Baiyun Airport North railway station is an underground railway station located in Huadu District, Guangzhou, Guangdong, China. It opened with the Eastern section of the Guangzhou–Foshan circular intercity railway on 30 November 2020.

The station serves Guangzhou Baiyun International Airport and is an interchange with Airport North station on Line 3 of the Guangzhou Metro.

References 

Railway stations in Guangdong
Railway stations in China opened in 2020
Airport railway stations in China